The 2003 South American Women's Football Championship (Campeonato Sudamericano de Fútbol Femenino 2003) was the fourth staging of the South American Women's Football Championship and determined the CONMEBOL's qualifiers for the 2003 FIFA Women's World Cup. The tournament was held between April 9 and April 27. 

Originally, the competition was scheduled to take place from April 5 to April 16, 2002 in Córdoba, Argentina. Later, it was moved to Peru, January/February 2003, with Lima and Chincha as venues, only for group A and the final round. Argentina retained the hosting rights for group C while Ecuador was appointed as host of the group B.

Brazil won the tournament for the fourth time in a row, after finishing first in the final round. Also, they qualified for the FIFA Women's World Cup along with Argentina, the runners-up.

Venues
Three venues (located in three different countries) were used for the tournament:

Officials
The following referees and assistant referees were named for the tournament:

Results
In contrast to previous tournaments, this edition's format had a first round with three regional groups, where the first-placed teams joined Brazil (who got a bye to the second round after winning the previous edition) for a final tournament in Peru. 

The final tournament was set up in a round-robin format, where each team played one match against each of the other teams within the group. The top two teams in the group qualified for the 2003 FIFA Women's World Cup in the United States, and the first-placed team won the tournament.

Three points were awarded for a win, one point for a draw, and zero points for a loss.

Tie-breaking criteria
Teams were ranked on the following criteria:
1. Greater number of points in all group matches
2. Goal difference in all group matches
3. Greater number of goals scored in all group matches
4. Head-to-head results
5. Drawing of lots by the CONMEBOL Organising Committee

First round

Group A
All matches were held in Lima, Peru.
Times listed were UTC–5.

Group B
All matches were held in Loja, Ecuador.
Times listed were UTC–5.

Group C
All matches were held in Salta, Argentina.
Times listed were UTC–3.

Final round
All matches were held in Lima, Peru.
Times listed were UTC–5.

Brazil won the tournament and qualified for the 2003 FIFA Women's World Cup along with runners-up Argentina.

Awards

Statistics

Goalscorers
7 goals
 Marisol Medina
6 goals
 Kátia
5 goals
 Sandra Valencia
4 goals

 Maitté Zamorano
 Marta
 Pretinha

3 goals
 Karina Alvariza
2 goals

 Natalia Gatti
 Alejandra Jiménez
 Formiga
 Ángela Garzón
 Wendy Villón
 Olienka Salinas

1 goal

 Analía Almeida
 Marisa Gerez
 Rosana Gómez
 Deisy Moreno
 Elizabeth Pérez
 Shirley Pérez
 María Teresa Urgel
 Cristiane
 Rosana
 María Castro
 Angelina Galvez
 Claudia Gutiérrez
 Nelia Imbachi
 Sonia Miranda
 Paulina Munera
 Leidy Ordóñez
 Gretel Campi
 Francisca Agüero
 Nadia Rodas
 Rossana Román
 Lorena Bosmans
 Adriana Dávila
 Martha Mori
 Miryam Tristán
 Gessika Lemos

Final ranking

External links
Official CONMEBOL Page 
Tables & results at RSSSF.com

2003 South American Women's Football Championship